"Untouched" is episode 4 of season 2 in the television show Angel, originally broadcast on the WB network. In this episode, a vision from Cordelia leads Angel to Bethany, a runaway teen who possesses barely controlled telekinetic powers. Unbeknownst to Angel, Lilah has brought Bethany to Los Angeles, hoping to groom her into being an assassin for Wolfram & Hart. Lilah attempts to provoke violent episodes in Bethany in order for Wolfram and Hart to gain control of the teen. First she has her cornered in an alley by potential rapists hired by Wolfram and Hart, and then she has her sexually abusive father appear and try to take Bethany back home. Meanwhile, Darla continues to plague Angel's dreams and Angel finds himself sleeping longer and longer hours.

Plot
Lilah sneaks into Lindsey's office to rifle through his papers, but Darla is there. Darla reveals she has been using a drug called Calynthia powder to keep Angel asleep while she manipulates his dreams. Angel wakes to find Cordelia and Wesley bickering about whether they should offer to pay Gunn. Angel and Wesley begin to discuss Angel's sleeping habits, but Cordelia suddenly gets a vision that sends Angel out to save a young girl from two potential rapists. As two men are about to attack the girl, she telekinetically slides a dumpster across the alleyway and smashes the men against a wall.

At the crime scene, Angel pretends to be a detective in order to get information about the crime from an officer. He wanders inside an old building and finds the young girl from the alley. Scared, she sends a rebar through Angel's chest, although upon realizing that she didn't kill him, she seems a little less afraid. The girl returns to the apartment she's staying at, revealing her roommate to be Lilah. Gunn arrives to offer his help and Angel sends him out to find information on the men Bethany hurt.

As Bethany drifts to sleep, she dreams of her abusive childhood and unintentionally sends a bedside lamp flying into Lilah, who was watching her fitful sleep. Terrified, Bethany flees from the apartment, throwing on a jacket. Bethany seeks Angel's help and they discuss her lack of control over her telekinetic powers. Holland stresses that if Lilah's work with Bethany is unsuccessful it could damage their other projects. Wesley deduces that Bethany has been sexually abused; when he pointedly mentions her father she loses control, sending both him and Angel flying through the air.

That night, Bethany finds Angel in his bed and she offers herself to him, as the abuse she has suffered has led her to believe that she is just an object for use. He declines, and after they talk, he sends her back to her own bed. After Angel helps Bethany work to control her power, he meets Gunn at one of the potential rapists' apartment. He brings up the payment idea and Gunn agrees, meaning that Gunn is now officially part of Angel Investigations. They find evidence that someone paid for the attack on Bethany.

Cordelia talks to Bethany over lattes until she is kidnapped by Wolfram & Hart's men. Angel and Gunn go after the men and Angel is able to get Bethany back from them. At the hotel, Bethany's father is used as a weapon to set her off and, as her control breaks, she causes serious structural damage to the building and lifting her father off his feet as she begins to telekinetically damage his body. Angel is able to break through to her, however and Bethany reveals that she has gained control over her powers by telling her father "Goodbye" before hurling him out of the window and allowing him to fall until she stops his descent five feet from the ground, letting him land unharmed.

Her independence regained and her self-confidence increasing, Bethany calmly confronts Lilah and  packs up her things, striking out on her own. Lilah and Angel speak on the doorstep as Lilah reminds him that he is not invited in. In a last-ditch effort to stop Bethany from trusting Angel, Lilah reveals that Angel is a vampire – to which an unfazed Bethany merely replies; "weird."  As Bethany walks away, Angel says to Lilah, "It looks like you're going to have to find someone else's brain to play with," to which Lilah replies, "Yeah, we have someone in mind." Angel tells Lilah "Goodnight," and, while he's walking away, Lilah snidely mutters "Sweet dreams."

Production details
The shot in which Bethany telekinetically explodes every window in the hotel was done using special effects, says production designer Stuart Blatt. The Angel production department built a set matching the superficial layout of the outside of the hotel, and filmed a window of the set exploding. The visual effects designer took that image and tiled it over the intact windows: "Through the magic of digital medium." Blatt says, "[we] created a whole wall of the hotel exploding."

References

External links

 

Angel (season 2) episodes
2000 American television episodes
Incest in television
Television episodes about telekinesis
Television episodes directed by Joss Whedon